Peter William Olber "Boy" Mould,  (14 December 1916? – 1 October 1941) was a Royal Air Force fighter pilot and flying ace of the Second World War.

Early life
The first son and third child of Charles and Ethel Mould, he grew up on the family estate at Great Easton, Leicestershire, and later at the Rectory at Stoke Dry in Rutland.

RAF career
Mould "joined the Royal Naval training ship HMS Conway, but changed to the Air Force when he joined Halton Apprentice School." In 1937, Mould was one of four Halton students in his intake of 180 selected to transfer to RAF College, Cranwell, to train to become pilot officers. There, he excelled at athletics.

After graduating in 1939, Pilot Officer Mould was assigned to No. 1 Squadron RAF at Tangmere. On the outbreak of the Second World War in September 1939, the squadron was deployed to France as part of the RAF Advanced Air Striking Force. On 30 October, he achieved the RAF's first victory of the war, downing a Dornier Do 17P photo-reconnaissance aircraft west of Toul. He would go on to claim six more aircraft in the skies over France, making him an ace. He was subsequently awarded the Distinguished Flying Cross (DFC) on 16 July 1940.

The squadron was withdrawn from France on 18 June. Though it fought in the Battle of Britain, Mould did not. He was posted to No. 5 Operational Training Unit as an instructor.

There, he led a flight of No. 261 Squadron RAF until 12 May. When No. 185 Squadron RAF was formed, he was given command as a squadron leader. He shot down an Italian Macchi C.200 on 11 July and, in "recognition of gallantry displayed in flying operations against the enemy" on Malta, was awarded a Bar to his DFC. The award was gazetted on 9 September 1941, reading:

 
While chasing one group of enemy aircraft, he was ambushed by another group which included Macchi C.202 fighters, the first of their type to appear over Malta. None of his comrades witnessed him being shot down. According to the squadron diary:

While on leave in January 1940, he had married Phyllis Hawkings in Leicestershire. His name is one of those inscribed on the Malta Memorial.

Victories
Mould's final tally was eight aircraft destroyed, along with two shared destroyed. He flew the Hawker Hurricane I until he was posted to Malta, at which point he piloted the Hurricane IIa.

References

External links
 Photograph of Mould and other No. 1 Squadron pilots in the possession of the Imperial War Museums

1910s births
1941 deaths
Royal Air Force squadron leaders
British World War II flying aces
Recipients of the Distinguished Flying Cross (United Kingdom)
Aviators killed by being shot down
Graduates of the Royal Air Force College Cranwell
Royal Air Force personnel killed in World War II
People from Great Easton, Leicestershire
Royal Air Force pilots of World War II
Military personnel from Leicestershire